Cloud computing has become a social phenomenon used by most people every day. As with every important social phenomenon there are issues that limit its widespread adoption. 
In the present scenario, cloud computing is seen as a fast developing area that can instantly supply extensible services by using internet with the help of hardware and software virtualization. The biggest advantage of cloud computing is flexible lease and release of resources as per the requirement of the user. Other benefits encompass betterment in efficiency, compensating the costs in operations. It curtails down the high prices of hardware and software
Although, there are numerous benefits of adopting the latest cloud technology still there are privacy issues involved in cloud computing because in the cloud at any time the data can outbreak the service provider and the information is deleted purposely. 
There are security issues of various kinds related with cloud computing falling into two broader categories: First, the issues related to the cloud security that the cloud providers face (like software provided to the organizations, infrastructure as a service). Secondly, the issues related to the cloud security that the customers experience (organizations who store data on the cloud)

Most issues start from the fact that the user loses control of their data, because it is stored on a computer belonging to someone else (the cloud provider). This happens when the owner of the remote servers is a person or organization other than the user; as their interests may point in different directions (for example, the user may wish that their information is kept private, but the owner of the remote servers may want to take advantage of it for their own business). Other issues hampering the adoption of cloud technologies include the uncertainties related to guaranteed QoS provisioning, automated management, and remediation in cloud systems.

Many issues relate to cloud computing, some of which are discussed here:

Threats and opportunities of the cloud

GNU project initiator Richard Stallman has characterized cloud computing as raising cost and information-ownership concerns. 
Oracle founder Larry Ellison viewed the trend to "cloud computing" in terms of "fashion-driven [...] complete gibberish".

However, the concept of cloud computing appeared to gain steam, with 56% of the major European technology decision-makers seeing the cloud as a priority in 2013 and 2014, and the cloud budget may reach 30% of the overall IT budget.

According to the TechInsights Report 2013: Cloud Succeeds based on a survey, cloud implementations generally meet or exceed expectations across major service models, such as Infrastructure as a Service (IaaS), Platform as a service (PaaS) and Software as a service (SaaS).

Several deterrents to the widespread adoption of cloud computing remain. They include:

 reliability
 availability of services and data
 security
 complexity
 costs
 regulations and legal issues
 performance
 migration
 reversion
 the lack of standards
 limited customization
 issues of privacy

The cloud offers many strong points: infrastructure flexibility, faster deployment of applications and data, cost control, adaptation of cloud resources to real needs, improved productivity, etc. The cloud market of the early 2010s - especially for private clouds - was dominated by software and services in SaaS mode and IaaS (infrastructure). PaaS and the public cloud lag in comparison.

Privacy

The increased use of cloud computing services such as Gmail and Google Docs has pressed the issue of privacy concerns of cloud computing services to the utmost importance.  The provider of such services lie in a position such that with the greater use of cloud computing services has given access to a plethora of data.  This access has the immense risk of data being disclosed either accidentally or deliberately. The privacy of the companies can be compromised as all the information is sent to the cloud service provider. Privacy advocates have criticized the cloud model for giving hosting companies' greater ease to control—and thus, to monitor at will—communication between host company and end user, and access user data (with or without permission). Instances such as the secret NSA program, working with AT&T, and Verizon, which recorded over 10 million telephone calls between American citizens, causes uncertainty among privacy advocates, and the greater powers it gives to telecommunication companies to monitor user activity. A cloud service provider (CSP) can complicate data privacy because of the extent of virtualization (virtual machines) and cloud storage used to implement cloud service. CSP operations, customer or tenant data may not remain on the same system, or in the same data center or even within the same provider's cloud; this can lead to legal concerns over jurisdiction.  While there have been efforts (such as US-EU Safe Harbor) to "harmonise" the legal environment, providers such as Amazon still cater to major markets (typically to the United States and the European Union) by deploying local infrastructure and allowing customers to select "regions and availability zones".
Cloud computing poses privacy concerns because the service provider can access the data that is on the cloud at any time.  It could accidentally or deliberately alter or even delete information. This becomes a major concern as these service providers employ administrators, which can leave room for potential unwanted disclosure of information on the cloud.

Other technical issues
Sometimes there can be some technical issues like servers might be down so at that time it becomes difficult to gain access to the resources at any time and from anywhere e.g. non-availability of services can be due to denial of service attack. To use the technique of cloud computing there should always be a strong internet connection without which we would not be able to take advantage of the cloud computing. The other issue related to the cloud computing is that it consumes the great power of the physical devices such as a smartphone.

Sharing information without a warrant

Many cloud providers can share information with third parties if necessary for purposes of law and order even without a warrant. That is permitted in their privacy policies which users have to agree to before they start using cloud services.

There are life-threatening situations in which there is no time to wait for the police to issue a warrant. Many cloud providers can share information immediately to the police in such situations.

Example of a privacy policy that allows this
The Dropbox privacy policy states that 
We may share information as discussed below …

Law & Order. We may disclose your information to third parties if we determine that such disclosure is reasonably necessary to (a) comply with the law; (b) protect any person from death or serious bodily injury; (c) prevent fraud or abuse of Dropbox or our users; or (d) protect Dropbox's property rights.

Previous situation about this
The Sydney Morning Herald reported about the Mosman bomb hoax, which was a life-threatening situation, that:

As to whether NSW Police needed a warrant to access the information it was likely to have, Byrne said it depended on the process taken. "Gmail does set out in their process in terms of their legal disclosure guidelines [that] it can be done by a search warrant ... but there are exceptions that can apply in different parts of the world and different service providers. For example, Facebook generally provides an exception for emergency life threatening situations that are signed off by law enforcement."

Another computer forensic expert at iT4ensics, which works for large corporations dealing with matters like internal fraud, Scott Lasak, said that police "would just contact Google" and "being of a police or FBI background Google would assist them".

"Whether or not they need to go through warrants or that sort of thing I'm not sure. But even for just an IP address they might not even need a warrant for something like that being of a police background.

...

NSW Police would not comment on whether it had received help from Google. The search giant also declined to comment, instead offering a standard statement on how it cooperated with law enforcement.

A spokesman for the online users' lobby group Electronic Frontiers Australia, Stephen Collins, said Google was likely to have handed over the need information on the basis of "probable cause or a warrant", which he said was "perfectly legitimate". He also said “It happens with relative frequency. … Such things are rarely used in Australia for trivial or malevolent purposes.”

Privacy solutions

Solutions to privacy in cloud computing include policy and legislation as well as end users' choices for how data is stored. The cloud service provider needs to establish clear and relevant policies that describe how the data of each cloud user will be accessed and used.  Cloud service users can encrypt data that is processed or stored within the cloud to prevent unauthorized access. Cryptographic encryption mechanisms are certainly the best options. In addition, authentication and integrity protection mechanisms ensure that data only goes where the customer wants it to go and it is not modified in transit.

Strong authentication is a mandatory requirement for any cloud deployment. User authentication is the primary basis for access control, and specially in the cloud environment, authentication and access control are more important than ever since the cloud and all of its data are publicly accessible. Biometric identification technologies linking users' biometrics information to their data are available. These technologies use searchable encryption techniques, and perform identification in an encrypted domain so that cloud providers or potential attackers do not gain access to sensitive data or even the contents of the individual queries.

Compliance

To comply with regulations including FISMA, HIPAA, and SOX in the United States, the Data Protection Directive in the EU and the credit card industry's PCI DSS, users may have to adopt community or hybrid deployment modes that are typically more expensive and may offer restricted benefits. This is how Google is able to "manage and meet additional government policy requirements beyond FISMA" and Rackspace Cloud or QubeSpace are able to claim PCI compliance.

Many providers also obtain a SAS 70 Type II audit, but this has been criticised on the grounds that the hand-picked set of goals and standards determined by the auditor and the auditee are often not disclosed and can vary widely. Providers typically make this information available on request, under non-disclosure agreement.

Customers in the EU contracting with cloud providers outside the EU/EEA have to adhere to the EU regulations on export of personal data.

A multitude of laws and regulations have forced specific compliance requirements onto many companies that collect, generate or store data. These policies may dictate a wide array of data storage policies, such as how long information must be retained, the process used for deleting data, and even certain recovery plans. Below are some examples of compliance laws or regulations.
 United States, the Health Insurance Portability and Accountability Act (HIPAA) requires a contingency plan that includes, data backups, data recovery, and data access during emergencies.
The privacy laws of Switzerland demand that private data, including emails, be physically stored in Switzerland.
In the United Kingdom, the Civil Contingencies Act of 2004 sets forth guidance for a business contingency plan that includes policies for data storage.
In a virtualized cloud computing environment, customers may never know exactly where their data is stored. In fact, data may be stored across multiple data centers in an effort to improve reliability, increase performance, and provide redundancies. This geographic dispersion may make it more difficult to ascertain legal jurisdiction if disputes arise.

FedRAMP

U.S. Federal Agencies have been directed by the Office of Management and Budget to use a process called FedRAMP (Federal Risk and Authorization Management Program) to assess and authorize cloud products and services.  Federal CIO Steven VanRoekel issued a memorandum to federal agency Chief Information Officers on December 8, 2011 defining how federal agencies should use FedRAMP.  FedRAMP consists of a subset of NIST Special Publication 800-53 security controls specifically selected to provide protection in cloud environments.  A subset has been defined for the FIPS 199 low categorization and the FIPS 199 moderate categorization.  The FedRAMP program has also established a Joint Accreditation Board (JAB) consisting of Chief Information Officers from DoD, DHS, and GSA.  The JAB is responsible for establishing accreditation standards for 3rd party organizations who perform the assessments of cloud solutions.  The JAB also reviews authorization packages, and may grant provisional authorization (to operate).  The federal agency consuming the service still has final responsibility for final authority to operate.

Legal

As with other changes in the landscape of computing, certain legal issues arise with cloud computing, including trademark infringement, security concerns and sharing of proprietary data resources.

The Electronic Frontier Foundation has criticized the United States government during the Megaupload seizure process for considering that people lose property rights by storing data on a cloud computing service.

One important but not often mentioned problem with cloud computing is the problem of who is in "possession" of the data. If a cloud company is the possessor of the data, the possessor has certain legal rights. If the cloud company is the "custodian" of the data, then a different set of rights would apply. The next problem in the legalities of cloud computing is the problem of legal ownership of the data. Many Terms of Service agreements are silent on the question of ownership.

These legal issues are not confined to the time period in which the cloud-based application is actively being used. There must also be consideration for what happens when the provider-customer relationship ends. In most cases, this event will be addressed before an application is deployed to the cloud. However, in the case of provider insolvencies or bankruptcy the state of the data may become blurred.

Vendor lock-in

Because cloud computing is still relatively new, standards are still being developed. Many cloud platforms and services are proprietary, meaning that they are built on the specific standards, tools and protocols developed by a particular vendor for its particular cloud offering. This can make migrating off a proprietary cloud platform prohibitively complicated and expensive.

Three types of vendor lock-in can occur with cloud computing:

 Platform lock-in: cloud services tend to be built on one of several possible virtualization platforms, for example VMware or Xen. Migrating from a cloud provider using one platform to a cloud provider using a different platform could be very complicated.
 Data lock-in: since the cloud is still new, standards of ownership, i.e. who actually owns the data once it lives on a cloud platform, are not yet developed, which could make it complicated if cloud computing users ever decide to move data off of a cloud vendor's platform. 
 Tools lock-in: if tools built to manage a cloud environment are not compatible with different kinds of both virtual and physical infrastructure, those tools will only be able to manage data or apps that live in the vendor's particular cloud environment.

Heterogeneous cloud computing is described as a type of cloud environment that prevents vendor lock-in, and aligns with enterprise data centers that are operating hybrid cloud models. The absence of vendor lock-in lets cloud administrators select their choice of hypervisors for specific tasks, or to deploy virtualized infrastructures to other enterprises without the need to consider the flavor of hypervisor in the other enterprise.

A heterogeneous cloud is considered one that includes on-premises private clouds, public clouds and software-as-a-service clouds. Heterogeneous clouds can work with environments that are not virtualized, such as traditional data centers. Heterogeneous clouds also allow for the use of piece parts, such as hypervisors, servers, and storage, from multiple vendors.

Cloud piece parts, such as cloud storage systems, offer APIs but they are often incompatible with each other. The result is complicated migration between backends, and makes it difficult to integrate data spread across various locations. This has been described as a problem of vendor lock-in.
The solution to this is for clouds to adopt common standards.

Heterogeneous cloud computing differs from homogeneous clouds, which have been described as those using consistent building blocks supplied by a single vendor. Intel General Manager of high-density computing, Jason Waxman, is quoted as saying that a homogeneous system of 15,000 servers would cost $6 million more in capital expenditure and use 1 megawatt of power.

Open source

Open-source software has provided the foundation for many cloud computing implementations, prominent examples being the Hadoop framework and VMware's Cloud Foundry. In November 2007, the Free Software Foundation released the Affero General Public License, a version of GPLv3 intended to close a perceived legal loophole associated with free software designed to run over a network.

Open standards

Most cloud providers expose APIs that are typically well documented (often under a Creative Commons license) but also unique to their implementation and thus not interoperable. Some vendors have adopted others' APIs and there are a number of open standards under development, with a view to delivering interoperability and portability. As of November 2012, the Open Standard with broadest industry support is probably OpenStack, founded in 2010 by NASA and Rackspace, and now governed by the OpenStack Foundation. OpenStack
supporters include AMD, Intel, Canonical, SUSE Linux, Red Hat, Cisco, Dell, HP, IBM, Yahoo, Huawei and now VMware.

Security

Security is generally a desired state of being free from harm (anything that compromises the state of an entity's well-being). As defined in information security, it is a condition in which an information asset is protected against its confidentiality (quality or state of being free from unauthorised or insecure disclosure contrary to the defined access rights as listed in the access control list and or matrix), integrity (a quality or state of being whole/ as complete as original and uncorrupted as functionally proven by the hash integrity values) and availability (a desired state of an information resource being accessible only by authorised parties (as listed in access control list and or matrix) in the desired state and at the right time. Security is an important domain in as far as cloud computing is concerned, there are a number of issues to be addressed if the cloud is to be perfectly secure (a condition i doubt will ever be achieved)(Martin Muduva, 2015).

As cloud computing is achieving increased popularity, concerns are being voiced about the security issues introduced through adoption of this new model. The effectiveness and efficiency of traditional protection mechanisms are being reconsidered as the characteristics of this innovative deployment model can differ widely from those of traditional architectures. An alternative perspective on the topic of cloud security is that this is but another, although quite broad, case of "applied security" and that similar security principles that apply in shared multi-user mainframe security models apply with cloud security.

The relative security of cloud computing services is a contentious issue that may be delaying its adoption. Physical control of the Private Cloud equipment is more secure than having the equipment off site and under someone else's control. Physical control and the ability to visually inspect data links and access ports is required in order to ensure data links are not compromised. Issues barring the adoption of cloud computing are due in large part to the private and public sectors' unease surrounding the external management of security-based services. It is the very nature of cloud computing-based services, private or public, that promote external management of provided services. This delivers great incentive to cloud computing service providers to prioritize building and maintaining strong management of secure services. Security issues have been categorised into sensitive data access, data segregation, privacy, bug exploitation, recovery, accountability, malicious insiders, management console security, account control, and multi-tenancy issues. Solutions to various cloud security issues vary, from cryptography, particularly public key infrastructure (PKI), to use of multiple cloud providers, standardisation of APIs, and improving virtual machine support and legal support.

Cloud computing offers many benefits, but is vulnerable to threats.  As cloud computing uses increase, it is likely that more criminals find new ways to exploit system vulnerabilities. Many underlying challenges and risks in cloud computing increase the threat of data compromise. To mitigate the threat, cloud computing stakeholders should invest heavily in risk assessment to ensure that the system encrypts to protect data, establishes trusted foundation to secure the platform and infrastructure, and builds higher assurance into auditing to strengthen compliance.  Security concerns must be addressed to maintain trust in cloud computing technology.

Data breach is a big concern in cloud computing. A compromised server could significantly harm the users as well as cloud providers. A variety of information could be stolen. These include credit card and social security numbers, addresses, and personal messages. The U.S. now requires cloud providers to notify customers of breaches. Once notified, customers now have to worry about identity theft and fraud, while providers have to deal with federal investigations, lawsuits and reputational damage. Customer lawsuits and settlements have resulted in over $1 billion in losses to cloud providers.

Availability

A cloud provider may shut down without warning. For instance, the Anki robot company suddenly went bankrupt in 2019, making 1.5 million robots unresponsive to voice command.

Sustainability

Although cloud computing is often assumed to be a form of green computing, there is currently no way to measure how "green" computers are.

The primary environmental problem associated with the cloud is energy use. Phil Radford of Greenpeace said “we are concerned that this new explosion in electricity use could lock us into old, polluting energy sources instead of the clean energy available today.”  Greenpeace ranks the energy usage of the top ten big brands in cloud computing, and successfully urged several companies to switch to clean energy. On Thursday, December 15, 2011, Greenpeace and Facebook announced together that Facebook would shift to use clean and renewable energy to power its own operations. Soon thereafter, Apple agreed to make all of its data centers ‘coal free’ by the end of 2013 and doubled the amount of solar energy powering its Maiden, NC data center. Following suit, Salesforce agreed to shift to 100% clean energy by 2020.

Citing the servers' effects on the environmental effects of cloud computing, in areas where climate favors natural cooling and renewable electricity is readily available, the environmental effects will be more moderate. (The same holds true for "traditional" data centers.) Thus countries with favorable conditions, such as Finland, Sweden and Switzerland, are trying to attract cloud computing data centers.
Energy efficiency in cloud computing can result from energy-aware scheduling and server consolidation. However, in the case of distributed clouds over data centers with different sources of energy including renewable energy, the use of energy efficiency reduction could result in a significant carbon footprint reduction.

Abuse

As with privately purchased hardware, customers can purchase the services of cloud computing for nefarious purposes. This includes password cracking and launching attacks using the purchased services. In 2009, a banking trojan illegally used the popular Amazon service as a command and control channel that issued software updates and malicious instructions to PCs that were infected by the malware.

IT governance

The introduction of cloud computing requires an appropriate IT governance model to ensure a secured computing environment and to comply with all relevant organizational information technology policies. As such, organizations need a set of capabilities that are essential when effectively implementing and managing cloud services, including demand management, relationship management, data security management, application lifecycle management, risk and compliance management.
A danger lies with the explosion of companies joining the growth in cloud computing by becoming providers. However, many of the infrastructural and logistical concerns regarding the operation of cloud computing businesses are still unknown. This over-saturation may have ramifications for the industry as a whole.

Consumer end storage

The increased use of cloud computing could lead to a reduction in demand for high storage capacity consumer end devices, due to cheaper low storage devices that stream all content via the cloud becoming more popular.
In a Wired article, Jake Gardner explains that while unregulated usage is beneficial for IT and tech moguls like Amazon, the anonymous nature of the cost of consumption of cloud usage makes it difficult for business to evaluate and incorporate it into their business plans.

Ambiguity of terminology

Outside of the information technology and software industry, the term "cloud" can be found to reference a wide range of services, some of which fall under the category of cloud computing, while others do not. The cloud is often used to refer to a product or service that is discovered, accessed and paid for over the Internet, but is not necessarily a computing resource. Examples of service that are sometimes referred to as "the cloud" include, but are not limited to, crowd sourcing, cloud printing, crowd funding, cloud manufacturing.

Performance interference and noisy neighbors

Due to its multi-tenant nature and resource sharing, cloud computing must also deal with the "noisy neighbor" effect. This effect in essence indicates that in a shared infrastructure, the activity of a virtual machine on a neighboring core on the same physical host may lead to increased performance degradation of the VMs in the same physical host, due to issues such as e.g. cache contamination. Due to the fact that the neighboring VMs may be activated or deactivated at arbitrary times, the result is an increased variation in the actual performance of cloud resources. This effect seems to be dependent on the nature of the applications that run inside the VMs but also other factors such as scheduling parameters and the careful selection may lead to optimized assignment in order to minimize the phenomenon. This has also led to difficulties in comparing various cloud providers on cost and performance using traditional benchmarks for service and application performance, as the time period and location in which the benchmark is performed can result in widely varied results. This observation has led in turn to research efforts to make cloud computing applications intrinsically aware of changes in the infrastructure so that the application can automatically adapt to avoid failure.

Monopolies and privatization of cyberspace

Philosopher Slavoj Žižek points out that, although cloud computing enhances content accessibility, this access is "increasingly grounded in the virtually monopolistic privatization of the cloud which provides this access". According to him, this access, necessarily mediated through a handful of companies, ensures a progressive privatization of global cyberspace. Žižek criticizes the argument purported by supporters of cloud computing that this phenomenon is part of the "natural evolution" of the Internet, sustaining that the quasi-monopolies "set prices at will but also filter the software they provide to give its "universality" a particular twist depending on commercial and ideological interests."

See also 
Cloud computing

References 

Criticisms of software and websites